The American Zionist Movement (AZM) is the American federation of Zionist groups and individuals affiliated with the World Zionist Organization. According to its mission, it is committed to Zionism: the idea that the Jewish people is one people with a shared history, values and language.

History 

The American Zionist Movement was founded in 1993 as a successor organization of the American Zionist Federation. Since then, it has been the official representative of the World Zionist Organization in the United States, and it is in charge of carrying out elections and sending delegates to the World Zionist Congress in Jerusalem every five years.

Principles 

The AZM subscribes to the five principles of the Jerusalem Program:

 The unity of the Jewish people and the centrality of Israel in Jewish life;
 The ingathering of the Jewish people in the historic homeland, Eretz Israel, through Aliyah from all countries;
 The strengthening of the State of Israel which is based on the prophetic vision of justice and peace;
 The preservation of the identity of the Jewish people through the fostering of Jewish, Hebrew and Zionist education and of Jewish spiritual and cultural values;
 The protection of Jewish rights everywhere.

Member Organizations 
Ameinu (formerly the Labor Zionist Alliance)
American Forum for Israel (formerly American Forum of Russian Speaking Jewry)
AMIT
Association of Reform Zionists of America (ARZA)
Baltimore Zionist District
Bnai Zion Foundation
Doreinu
Hadassah Women's Zionist Organization of America
Herut, North America (Magshimey Herut)
Mercaz USA (Zionist Organization of Conservative Judaism)
Na'amat-USA
Partners for Progressive Israel (formerly Meretz USA)
Religious Zionists of America (Mizrachi)
World Sephardic Zionist Federation - Ohavei Zion
Zionist Organization of America

Affiliated Organizations:

 AFSI - Americans for a Safe Israel
 Am Yisrael Foundation
 B'nai B'rith
 Emunah of America
 Endowment for Middle East Truth (EMET)
 Friends of Israel Scouts - Tzofim
 Israel Forever Foundation
 Jewish National Fund-USA
 WIZO USA

Zionist Youth Movements:
 American Zionist Youth Council
 Bnei Akiva
 BBYO
 Habonim Dror North America
 Hashomer Hatzair
 NCSY
 NFTY
 USY
 Young Judaea

See also 
Hadassah Women's Zionist Organization of America
Nefesh B'Nefesh

References 
 
 doingzionism.org
 worldmh.org.il
 herutna.org

 
Zionist organizations
Organizations established in 1993
Zionism in the United States
1993 establishments in the United States
World Zionist Organization